Gracie! is a biopic television film on the life of Gracie Fields, with Jane Horrocks playing Fields and Tom Hollander her husband Monty Banks. It covers her career before the Second World War and the decline in her popularity during the war.

Cast
Gracie Fields - Jane Horrocks
Monty Banks - Tom Hollander
Harry Parr-Davies, Gracie's accompanist - David Dawson
Fred Stansfield, Gracie's father - Tony Haygarth
Jenny Stansfield, Gracie's mother - Ellie Haddington
Basil Dean - Alistair Petrie

Awards and nominations
Hollander, nominated for best supporting actor, British Academy Television Awards 2010

External links
http://www.imdb.com/title/tt1499786/
http://www.bbc.co.uk/programmes/b00p1p41

2009 television films
2009 films
British television films
British biographical films
Films directed by Brian Percival
2000s British films